The Little Residence is a 1942 German comedy film directed by Hans H. Zerlett and starring Winnie Markus, Johannes Riemann, and Lil Dagover.

The film's sets were designed by the art directors Max Seefelder and Hans Sohnle. It was shot at the Bavaria Studios in Munich.

Cast

References

Bibliography

External links 
 

1942 films
1940s historical comedy films
German historical comedy films
Films of Nazi Germany
1940s German-language films
Films directed by Hans H. Zerlett
Films set in 1910
Films about theatre
Bavaria Film films
Films shot at Bavaria Studios
German black-and-white films
1942 comedy films
1940s German films